Inge Görmer (born 11 April 1934) is a former East-German speedskater. She took part in five international championships. Four times as East-German at the World Allround Championships (1956, 1957, 1958 and 1959) and once, as member of the German Unified team, at the Winter Olympics (1960).

History
At her international debut, during the Wch Allround of 1956 in Kvarnsveden, she finished 10th. A year later, during the op het Wch Allround of 1957 in Imatrankoski, she placed 15th, but the next year, in Kristinehamn, she had improved to become 7th. Her last World championship in Sverdlovsk, 1959 ended with a somewhat disappointing 23rd place, without being able to skate her favorite distance, the 3000 m.
In her last active year, she competed at the first Olympic speed skating tournament open for women, the Squaw Valley 1960 Winter Olympics. Her she finished 16th (1500 m) and 13th (3000 m)

East-German records
Over the course of her career, Görmer skated eight East-German national records, the last three of which were also All-German all-time best ever marks:

Personal records
To put these personal records in perspective, the column WR lists the official world records on the dates that Görmer skated her personal records.

References
Notes

Bibliography

 Budzisch, Margot with Klaus Huhn, Lothar Skorning and Günther Wonneberger. Chronik des DDR-Sports(in German). Berlin, Germany: Spotless-Verlag, 2000.
 Eng, Trond and Marnix Koolhaas. National All Time & Encyclopedia Men/Ladies as at 1 July 1985, Issue No. 3: "German Democratic Republic"(bilingual Norwegian/English). Degernes, Norway: WSSSA-Skøytenytt, 1985.
 Huhn, Klaus. Die DDR bei Olympia, 1956–1988(in German). Berlin, Germany: Spotless-Verlag, 2001. .
 Kluge, Volker. Das große Lexikon der DDR-Sportler: Die 1000 erfolgreichsten und populärsten Sportlerinnen und Sportler aus der DDR, ihre Erfolge und Biographien(in German). Berlin, Germany: Schwarzkopf & Schwarzkopf, 2004. .
 Zickow, Alfred. 100 Jahre Deutsche Eisschnellauf Meisterschaften, 1891–1991. Ein Beitrag zur Geschichte des Eisschnellaufes(in German). Berlin, Germany: DESG, 1991.

External links

 
 
 

1934 births
Living people
German female speed skaters
Speed skaters at the 1960 Winter Olympics
Olympic speed skaters of the United Team of Germany